Amir Sofi may refer to:

Amir Sofi (cricketer, born 1992), Indian cricketer
Amir Aziz Sofi (born 1990), Indian cricketer
Amir Sofi (musician), Darbuka player